Fane Michael Flaws (16 May 1951 – 17 June 2021) was a New Zealand musician, songwriter, and artist.

Career
Flaws was a member of bands including Blerta, Spats, and The Crocodiles. Until joining Blerta he was known by his second name Michael: Bruno Lawrence of Blerta insisted Fane was a better name.

When he was in The Crocodiles, he wrote the song "Tears" with Arthur Baysting. The single reached number 17 in the New Zealand charts.

He wrote songs for the films Braindead and Meet the Feebles, even voicing the Musician Frog in the latter.

He animated the revamped titles for Radio with Pictures in 1986, a Television New Zealand programme featuring popular and alternative music.

He was co-author, with Arthur Baysting and Peter Dasent, of the children's book The Underwater Melon Man and Other Unreasonable Rhymes. The book was published in 1998, a CD in 1999. In 2011, an edition was published with a DVD.  Musicians appearing include Chris Knox, Jenny Morris, Neil Finn, Tim Finn, Renée Geyer, Tony Backhouse, Bic Runga and Boh Runga, the Topp Twins, Che Fu & King Kapisi and Dave Dobbyn.

He also designed rugs, paints and created assemblage art works from found objects such as demolition timber and building fittings.

Short film

 Rodney and Juliet (1990)

Music videos
Directed unless otherwise noted

Awards
 Best Video at the New Zealand Music Awards, 1985 for The Narcs: Diamonds on China
 Best Video at the New Zealand Music Awards, 1988 for Holidaymakers: Sweet Lovers
 Best First Film at Clermont Ferrand Film Festival for Rodney and Juliet
 Best TV Graphics, 1989 NZ LIFTA Awards for Radio with Pictures

Commercials
 Lemon & Paeroa soft drink. (1991)
 McDonald's (1991)
 New Zealand Police – community service commercial on babysitting. (1981)
 NZ Post (1991)
 Rexona Dry Solid anti perspirant (1990)

Death
Flaws died on 17 June 2021, aged 70.

References

General references
 Dix, John, Stranded in Paradise, Penguin, 2005. 
 Eggleton, David, Ready To Fly, Craig Potton, 2003.

External links
Fane Flaws official website
AudioCulture profile

 
NZ On Screen biography and screenography
Fane Flaws on YouTube
Radio New Zealand Interview
Fane Flaws  in artists profiles at Dilana Rugs
Tears – The Crocodiles, Music Video, 1980 NZ On Screen

APRA Award winners
New Zealand musicians
New Zealand artists
New Zealand children's writers
2021 deaths
1951 births